There have been five baronetcies created for persons with the surname Fraser, one in the Baronetage of Nova Scotia and four in the Baronetage of the United Kingdom. As of 2007 four of the creations are extinct while one is extant.

The Fraser Baronetcy, of Durris in the County of Kincardine, was created in the Baronetage of Nova Scotia on 2 August 1673 for Alexander Fraser. The title became extinct on the death of the second Baronet in 1729.

The Fraser Baronetcy, of Ledeclune in the County of Inverness, was created in the Baronetage of the United Kingdom on 27 November 1806 for Alexander Fraser. The third Baronet served with the 7th Hussars in Spain during the Peninsular War, and was on the staff of the Duke of Wellington during the Waterloo Campaign. The fourth Baronet was an author and collector and also represented Barnstaple, Ludlow and Kidderminster in the House of Commons. The fifth Baronet sat as Member of Parliament for Harborough. The title became extinct on the death of the sixth Baronet in 1979.

The Fraser Baronetcy, of Cromarty, and of Vale Avenue in the Metropolitan Borough of Chelsea, was created in the Baronetage of the United Kingdom on 29 June 1921 for Malcolm Fraser. He was Editor of the Evening Standard and Day Editor of the Daily Express and also held the honorary post of Lord-Lieutenant of Surrey. The title became extinct on the death of his son, the second Baronet, in 1991.

The Fraser Baronetcy, of Tain in the County of Ross, was created in the Baronetage of the United Kingdom on 12 July 1943 for John Fraser. He was Regius Professor of Clinical Surgery at the University of Edinburgh and Honorary Surgeon to His Majesty the King in Scotland. As of 2019, the title is held by his great-grandson, the fourth Baronet, who succeeded his father in that year.

The Fraser Baronetcy, of Dineiddwg in the County of Stirling, was created in the Baronetage of the United Kingdom on 19 January 1961. For more information on this creation, see the Baron Fraser of Allander.

Fraser baronets, of Durris (1673)
Sir Alexander Fraser, 1st Baronet (c. 1607–1681)
Sir Peter Fraser, 2nd Baronet (died 1729)

Fraser baronets, of Ledeclune (1806)
The Baronetcy of Ledeclune in the county of Inverness, Scotland was created in the Baronetage of the United Kingdom on 27 November 1806 for William Fraser. The third Baronet served with the 7th Hussars in Spain during the Peninsular War, and was on the staff of the Duke of Wellington during the Waterloo Campaign. The fourth Baronet was an author and collector and also represented Barnstaple, Ludlow and Kidderminster in the House of Commons. The fifth Baronet sat as Member of Parliament for Harborough. The title became extinct on the death of the sixth Baronet in 1979.

Sir William Fraser, 1st Baronet (died 1818)
Sir William Fraser, 2nd Baronet (1787–1827)
Sir James John Fraser, 3rd Baronet (died 1834)
Sir William Augustus Fraser, 4th Baronet (1826–1898)
Sir Keith Alexander Fraser, 5th Baronet (1867–1935), son of Lieutenant-Colonel James Keith Fraser, C.M.G. 3rd son of the 3rd Baronet.
Sir Keith Charles Adolphus Fraser, 6th Baronet (1911–1979)

Fraser baronets, of Cromarty and Vale Avenue (1921)

Sir John Malcolm Fraser, 1st Baronet (1878–1949)
Sir Basil Malcolm Fraser, 2nd Baronet (1920–1992)

Fraser baronets, of Tain (1943)
Sir John Fraser, 1st Baronet (1885–1947)
Sir James David Fraser, 2nd Baronet (1924–1997)
Sir Iain Michael Duncan Fraser, 3rd Baronet (1951-2019)
Sir Benjamin James Fraser, 4th Baronet (born 1986)

Fraser baronets, of Dineiddwg (1961)
see the Baron Fraser of Allander

References

Further reading

Baronetcies in the Baronetage of the United Kingdom
Extinct baronetcies in the Baronetage of Nova Scotia
Extinct baronetcies in the Baronetage of the United Kingdom